Sunu Lakshmi (born 27 October 1991) is an India actress who works in Tamil and Malayalam films.

Career
She started her acting career in  a Telefilm called Shakunam directed by Biju Chandran and Telecast in Dooradarshan in 2006. Her first after that she was in Sengathu Bhoomiyile directed by Rathinakumar. Then her next project Eppothum Vendral directed by Siva Shanmugan. Touring Talkies directed by S. A. Chandrasekhar. Malayalam movie Snehamulloral Kudeullapol directed by Riju Nair. She starred in Aramm. Her Malayalam album "Azhakotha Maina" with Asif Ali was so famous.

Personal life
She attended a school run by Seventh-day Adventists. She completed her degree at Annamalai University.

Filmography
All films are in Tamil, unless otherwise noted.

References

External links
Facebook

1991 births
Living people
Actresses from Kochi
21st-century Indian actresses
Actresses in Malayalam cinema
Indian film actresses
Actresses in Tamil cinema